Salvage enzymes are enzymes, nucleoside kinases, required during cell division to "salvage" nucleotides, present in body fluids, for the manufacture of DNA. They catalyze the phosphorylation of nucleosides to nucleoside - 5'-phosphates, that are further phosphorylated to triphosphates, that can be built into the growing DNA chain. The salvage enzymes are synthesized during the G1 phase in anticipation of DNA synthesis. After the cell division has been completed, the salvage enzymes, no longer required, are degraded. During interphase the cell derives its requirement of nucleoside-5'-phosphates by de novo synthesis, that leads directly to the 5'-monophosphate nucleotides.

Cell cycle
Enzymes